Star Blazers: Odyssey of the Celestial Ark, known in Japan as , is a 2014 film based on the Space Battleship Yamato 2199 anime series.  The movie is set during the events of the series, primarily as the eponymous spaceship Yamato makes its way back to Earth after a long voyage to the planet Iscandar.

Marketing
Prior to advertising of the home video release of the movie, writers had used the English translations Space Battleship Yamato 2199: Star-Voyaging Ark and Space Battleship Yamato 2199: Ark of the Stars.  Home video packaging announced in April 2015 revealed Xebec's choice of Space Battleship Yamato 2199: Odyssey of the Celestial Ark as the official English title.

Reception
The film grossed ¥68.8 million at the Japanese box office in its first week of release, and ¥269 million in total.

Writing for the Kotaku blog, reviewer Richard Eisenbeis generally praised the movie, particularly the debut of Gatlantis as a potent threat, the portrayal of the Garmillon characters, the focus on two Yamato crew members who had received only minimal attention in the Yamato 2199 series, and Kodai's growth as a leader.  However, the reviewer was less impressed with what felt "more like the first arc of a new series" rather than a completely self-contained story.

References

Xebec (studio)
Shochiku
Space Battleship Yamato
Military science fiction films
Space opera films
2014 films
2010s science fiction films
Japanese animated science fiction films
Films set in the 22nd century
2010s Japanese films